Archie David Lenham (born 23 July 2004) is an English professional cricketer who plays for Sussex County Cricket Club. Lenham is a right-handed batsman and a right-arm leg break bowler.

The son of Neil Lenham and grandson of Les Lenham, he was the youngest ever player to play for Eastbourne Cricket Club. He made his T20 debut for Sussex, aged 16, against Gloucestershire in the 2021 t20 Blast on 11 June 2021 and became the second youngest player ever to play in t20 Blast history after Derbyshire's Hamidullah Qadri. He also became the first player ever to make his T20 Blast debut who was born after the inception of the tournament. He made his List A debut on 23 July 2021, for Sussex in the 2021 Royal London One-Day Cup. In August 2021, Lenham was signed for Southern Brave as a replacement for Liam Dawson in the 2021 season of The Hundred. Lenham made his first-class debut on 30 August 2021, for Sussex in the 2021 County Championship. In January 2023 Lenhman signed a new contract with Sussex.

References

External links

2004 births
Living people
English cricketers
Sussex cricketers
Sportspeople from Eastbourne